

Total statistics

Statistics by country

Statistics by competition

UEFA Europa League / UEFA Cup

Romanian football clubs in international competitions